John Moore, MD (August 18, 1826 – March 18, 1907) was a leading United States Army physician during the American Civil War who rose to become Surgeon General of the Army in the late 1880s.

Early life and medical training
Moore was born in Bloomington, Indiana. He attended Indiana University and graduated in 1845. He had graduated from the Medical College of Ohio in Cincinnati in 1844. He scored first place in the internship examination at the Commercial Hospital and Lunatic Asylum of Ohio (chartered in 1821), the hospital whose attending physicians were members of the MCO faculty. He served during 1845–46, and then filled in when another intern had to leave the following mid-year.

He took further medical courses at the University of Louisville Medical Department in 1848–49 and at the medical department of the University of the City of New York in 1849–50, graduating later that same year. After one-year internship in Bellevue Hospital and two years with the New York Dispensary, Moore entered the Army as assistant surgeon in 1853. He served in Fort Myers, Florida, and then in a fort in Boston Harbor before going to the Utah Territory frontier as a surgeon during the Utah War in 1857. He was promoted to the rank of captain in 1858.

Civil War
When the Civil War broke out in 1861, Dr. Moore was attached to the Cincinnati Marine Hospital, which became the Military Hospital of Cincinnati, that was opened in May 1861. He was promoted to surgeon in 1862. In Cincinnati, he was assigned to previously unstable hospital situations. Then he was assigned to the Army of the Potomac and served as divisional chief surgeon at the battles of Antietam and Fredericksburg. He was promoted to Medical Director of the V Corps and served in that role at the Battle of Chancellorsville.

In June 1863 he became Medical Director of the Army of the Tennessee and later accompanied Maj. Gen. William T. Sherman on his famous "March to the Sea" and through the Carolinas. In 1865 he received the brevet rank of colonel and was mustered out of the volunteer army with the close of the war.

Postbellum career
Dr. Moore stayed in the regular army following the Civil War and served in a variety of medical posts, spending over a decade on assignment in New York City. In 1883 he was made Assistant Medical Purveyor with the rank of colonel. In 1886, he succeeded Robert Murray as Surgeon General and was promoted to brigadier general.  He held this post until 1890, when he was succeeded by Jedediah Hyde Baxter. Moore was retired for age in 1900 and lived the rest of his life in Washington, D.C., where he died at the age of 82 of an interstitial nephritis.

Moore is buried in Arlington National Cemetery.

See also

Medical and Surgical History of the War of the Rebellion

Notes

References

Arlington National Cemetery webpage for Dr. Moore

Further reading

1826 births
1907 deaths
Burials at Arlington National Cemetery
Deaths from nephritis
Indiana State University alumni
University of Cincinnati alumni
Surgeons General of the United States Army
People from Bloomington, Indiana
Physicians from Cincinnati
People of Ohio in the American Civil War
Union Army surgeons